The 2015 World Rugby Nations Cup was the tenth edition of the international rugby union tournament, a competition created by the World Rugby. For the ninth time in a row, it was held at the Stadionul Naţional de Rugby in Bucharest, Romania, and was played between 12 and 21 June, running alongside 2015 World Rugby Tbilisi Cup in Georgia.

, the hosts, were joined by ENC side  and Argentina A side, Argentina Jaguars, while  returned for the first time since 2011, as they and Romania prepare to participate in the 2015 Rugby World Cup.

Hosts Romania won the tournament, for the first time since 2013, with three from three victories.

Standings

Fixtures
The fixtures were announced on 1 May 2015.

Matchday 1

Matchday 2

Matchday 3

See also
 2015 World Rugby Pacific Nations Cup
 2015 World Rugby Tbilisi Cup

References

External links

2015
2015 rugby union tournaments for national teams
International rugby union competitions hosted by Romania
2014–15 in Romanian rugby union
2014–15 in Spanish rugby union
2015 in Argentine rugby union
rugby union
Sport in Bucharest